Dudley Leroy Bradley (born March 19, 1957) is an American former professional basketball player who played nine seasons in the National Basketball Association (NBA).

Bradley played collegiately for the North Carolina Tar Heels and was selected 13th overall in the 1979 NBA draft by the Indiana Pacers. He played for seven different NBA teams and left the league after the 1988–89 NBA season with averages of 5.2 points, 1.8 rebounds, and 1.9 assists per game.

In two separate games in November 1980, as a member of the Pacers, Bradley recorded a notable 9 steals. The season before (1979–80) he set an NBA rookie record for steals in a season with 211 (2.57 per game).

As a college player, Bradley made one of the most memorable plays in University of North Carolina history on Jan. 17, 1979. With the game clock under 10 seconds and the Tar Heels trailing by one point in a road game against rival N.C. State, Bradley stole the ball from Wolfpack guard Clyde Austin and dribbled for an uncontested dunk that gave UNC a 70–69 win. His prowess at forcing turnovers and defending opposing players in college earned Bradley the nickname "The Secretary of Defense."

After his NBA career, Bradley played a season or two in the World Basketball League.  He played in that league for the Saskatchewan Storm in 1990–91. He also worked as a coach in the Continental Basketball Association and the World Basketball League.  In 1994, he was named head coach of the Brevard College Tornados men's basketball team, a position he held until 1999.

In September 2003, Bradley became a Maryland Transportation Authority police officer.

NBA career statistics

Regular season

|-
| align="left" | 1979–80
| align="left" | Indiana
| 82 || - || 24.7 || .452 || .400 || .782 || 2.7 || 3.1 || 2.6 || 0.6 || 8.4
|-
| align="left" | 1980–81
| align="left" | Indiana
| 82 || - || 22.8 || .474 || .125 || .702 || 2.4 || 2.3 || 2.3 || 0.5 || 8.0
|-
| align="left" | 1981–82
| align="left" | Phoenix
| 64 || 3 || 14.6 || .445 || .250 || .740 || 1.4 || 1.3 || 1.2 || 0.2 || 5.1
|-
| align="left" | 1982–83
| align="left" | Chicago
| 58 || 11 || 11.8 || .516 || .200 || .800 || 1.8 || 1.8 || 0.8 || 0.2 || 3.5
|-
| align="left" | 1984–85
| align="left" | Washington
| 73 || 24 || 16.9 || .475 || .313 || .684 || 1.8 || 2.4 || 1.3 || 0.3 || 4.9
|-
| align="left" | 1985–86
| align="left" | Washington
| 70 || 7 || 12.0 || .349 || .250 || .571 || 1.4 || 1.5 || 1.2 || 0.0 || 2.8
|-
| align="left" | 1986–87
| align="left" | Milwaukee
| 68 || 2 || 13.2 || .357 || .260 || .810 || 1.5 || 1.0 || 1.5 || 0.1 || 3.1
|-
| align="left" | 1987–88
| align="left" | Milwaukee
| 2 || 0 || 2.5 || .000 || .000 || .000 || 0.5 || 0.5 || 0.0 || 0.0 || 0.0
|-
| align="left" | 1987–88
| align="left" | New Jersey
| 63 || 15 || 22.7 || .429 || .366 || .763 || 2.0 || 2.4 || 1.8 || 0.7 || 6.7
|-
| align="left" | 1988–89
| align="left" | Atlanta
| 38 || 0 || 7.0 || .326 || .258 || .500 || 0.8 || 0.6 || 0.4 || 0.1 || 1.9
|- class="sortbottom"
| style="text-align:center;" colspan="2"| Career
| 600 || 62 || 17.0 || .440 || .293 || .730 || 1.8 || 1.9 || 1.6 || 0.3 || 5.2
|}

Playoffs

|-
| align="left" | 1980–81
| align="left" | Indiana
| 2 || - || 9.5 || .333 || 1.000 || 1.000 || 1.0 || 1.0 || 1.0 || 0.0 || 4.5
|-
| align="left" | 1981–82
| align="left" | Phoenix
| 7 || - || 3.4 || .250 || .000 || 1.000 || 0.1 || 0.7 || 0.1 || 0.1 || 0.7
|-
| align="left" | 1984–85
| align="left" | Washington
| 4 || 0 || 10.3 || .556 || .200 || .750 || 1.5 || 1.5 || 0.5 || 0.0 || 3.5
|-
| align="left" | 1985–86
| align="left" | Washington
| 5 || 0 || 16.4 || .414 || .300 || .667 || 1.0 || 1.4 || 1.0 || 0.0 || 6.6
|-
| align="left" | 1986–87
| align="left" | Milwaukee
| 12 || 0 || 3.8 || .364 || .000 || .500 || 0.0 || 0.2 || 0.3 || 0.0 || 0.8
|- class="sortbottom"
| style="text-align:center;" colspan="2"| Career
| 30 || 0 || 7.1 || .394 || .227 || .722 || 0.5 || 0.7 || 0.4 || 0.0 || 2.3
|}

See also
List of National Basketball Association players with 9 or more steals in a game

Notes

External links
NBA stats @ basketball-reference.com

1957 births
Living people
20th-century African-American sportspeople
21st-century African-American people
African-American basketball players
African-American police officers
American police officers
American expatriate basketball people in Canada
American men's basketball players
Atlanta Hawks players
Basketball coaches from Maryland
Basketball players from Baltimore
Chicago Bulls players
Continental Basketball Association coaches
Detroit Spirits players
Indiana Pacers draft picks
Indiana Pacers players
Milwaukee Bucks players
New Jersey Nets players
North Carolina Tar Heels men's basketball players
Omaha Racers players
People from Edgewood, Maryland
Phoenix Suns players
Shooting guards
Small forwards
Toronto Tornados players
Washington Bullets players